The Rizing Zephyr Fukuoka is a Japanese professional basketball team, playing in the second division of the B.League. They are based in Fukuoka Prefecture and were coached  by Joe Bryant, the father of Kobe Bryant, in 2015.

Roster

Notable players

Head coaches
Toshihiro Goto
Carl John Neumann (2007–09)
Tadaharu Ogawa (2009–12)
Atsushi Kanazawa (2012–13, 2016-17)
Mack Tuck (2013)
Kimitoshi Sano (2013-14)
James Duncan (2014)
Ken Hamanaka (2014)
Joe Bryant (2015)
Tomohiro Moriyama (2015-16)
Takatoshi Ishibashi (2016)
Josep Clarós (2016, 2020-21)
Kentaro Hori (2017)
Ryuji Kawai (2017-18)
Bob Nash (2018-19)
Iurgi Caminos (2019-20)
Eiki Umezaki (2021-22)
Taiki Yoshinaga (2022)
Moncho López (2022-present)

Arenas

Teriha Sekisui House Arena
Fukuoka Citizens Gymnasium
Iizuka Daiichi Gymnasium
Kitakyushu City General Gymnasium
Kurume Arena
Okawa Citizens Gymnasium
Mizuma General Gymnasium

References

External links 
 Rizing Fukuoka at Asia-Basket.com
 Team official website
 

 
Basketball teams in Japan
Basketball teams　established in 2005
Sports teams in Fukuoka Prefecture
2005 establishments in Japan